Arunabh Kumar (born 26 November 1982) is an Indian entrepreneur, producer, director, screenwriter and an actor. He is the founder of The Viral Fever.

He was the CEO of The Viral Fever but later stepped down after being accused of sexual harassment by a former employee and several other women. He rejoined TVF after a hiatus of 3 years as a Mentor.

Early life
Arunabh Kumar was brought up in Muzaffarpur in Bihar. After completing his B.Tech. in Electrical Engineering from IIT Kharagpur, he joined Shah Rukh Khan's production house Red Chillies Entertainment as an assistant's position under Farah Khan. He was the assistant director for the movie Om Shanti Om.

MTV rejected his creation Engineer's Diary which led to the launching of The Viral Fever.

Filmography

Television

Controversies 
Arunabh Kumar found himself amidst a controversy in March 2017. Over 50 women stepped up to accuse him of sexual harassment after an anonymous Medium post titled The Indian Uber- That is TVF.

FIR filed against Kumar on 17 March 2017 on the basis of a 3rd party complaint made by a Mumbai-based lawyer. On March 29, 2017, he was booked for molestation after a woman filed a police complaint in Mumbai. Following this, a second FIR was filed against him while his whereabouts were unknown.

On 16 June 2017, Kumar, accused in multiple sexual harassment cases, stepped down as TVF CEO and gave the charge to Dhawal Gusain.

On 28 December 2022, Mumbai Court acquitted Arunabh Kumar of all charges, years after he faced charges for sexual misconduct.

Awards and achievements
The Economic Times 40 under Forty list for 2016
Fortune Top 40 under 40 list for 2015
GQ's List of Most Influential Young Indians for 2015 & 2016
"Entrepreneur" List of 10 Geniuses Redefining Creativity, 2016
Man's World - Men of the Year, 2014
AFAQs - "Newsmaker of the Year" in 2014.

References

External links
 
 
 

Living people
Businesspeople from Bihar
IIT Kharagpur alumni
People from Muzaffarpur
1982 births
Indian YouTubers
Comedy YouTubers